Group E of the 1993 Federation Cup Europe/Africa Zone was one of five pools in the Europe/Africa zone of the 1993 Federation Cup. Four teams competed in a round robin competition, with the top two teams advancing to the play-offs.

Israel vs. Tunisia

Slovenia vs. Zimbabwe

Slovenia vs. Greece

Zimbabwe vs. Tunisia

Israel vs. Slovenia

Greece vs. Zimbabwe

Israel vs. Greece

Slovenia vs. Tunisia

Israel vs. Zimbabwe

Greece vs. Tunisia

See also
Fed Cup structure

References

External links
 Fed Cup website

1993 Federation Cup Europe/Africa Zone